Mezhyrich (also referred to as Mezhirich) is a village (selo) in central Ukraine. It is located in Cherkasy Raion (district) of Cherkasy Oblast (province), near the point where the Rosava River flows into the Ros'. Mezhyrich belongs to Kaniv urban hromada, one of the hromadas of Ukraine.

Until 18 July 2020 Mezhyrich belonged to Kaniv Raion. The raion was abolished as part of the administrative reform of Ukraine, which reduced the number of raions of Cherkasy Oblast to four. The area of Kaniv Raion was merged into Cherkasy Raion. Mezhyrich hosted the administration of Mezhyrich rural hromada, which was abolished and merged into Kaniv urban hromada.

Pre-historic finds

In 1965, a farmer dug up the lower jawbone of a mammoth while in the process of expanding his cellar. Further excavations revealed the presence of 4 huts, made up of a total of 149 mammoth bones. These dwellings, dating back some 15,000 years, were determined to have been shelters known to have been constructed by pre-historic man, usually attributed to Cro-Magnon. Also found on the site:
 a map inscribed onto a bone, presumably showing the area around the settlement
 remains of a "drum", made of a mammoth skull painted with a pattern of red ochre dots and lines
 amber ornaments and fossil shells

See also
Mezine
Prehistoric Europe

Bibliography 

 Bibikov, S. N. (Sergei Nikolaevich) (1981). Drevneishii Muzykalnyi Kompleks iz Kostei Mamonta: Ocherk Materialnoi i Dukhovnoi Kultury Paleoliticheskogo Cheloveka (The Oldest Musical Complex Made of Mammoth Bones). Akademiia Nauk Ukrainskoi SSR, Institut Arkheologii. Kiev, Ukraine: Naukova Dumka.  In Russian.  Contains summary in English and French; table of contents also in English and French.
 Pidoplichko, I. H. (1998) Upper Palaeolithic dwellings of mammoth bones in the Ukraine: Kiev-Kirillovskii, Gontsy, Dobranichevka, Mezin and Mezhirich, Oxford: J. and E. Hedges. .
 Pidoplichko, I. H. (1978)  The Mezhirich mammoth-bone houses, U.S. Geological Survey. ISBN B0006WZGIS.
  (1972). Історія міст і сіл Української CCP - Черкаська область (History of Towns and Villages of the Ukrainian SSR - Cherkasy Oblast), Kiev.

On-line citations
 Ancient Inventions of Ukraine by Andrew Gregorovich
 Mezhirich - Mammoth Camp at Don's Maps: Resources for the study of Archaeology

References

Archaeological sites in Ukraine
Villages in Cherkasy Raion